Wilson Township may refer to several places in the U.S. state of Missouri:

 Wilson Township, Adair County, Missouri
 Wilson Township, Audrain County, Missouri
 Wilson Township, Dallas County, Missouri
 Wilson Township, Gentry County, Missouri
 Wilson Township, Greene County, Missouri
 Wilson Township, Grundy County, Missouri
 Wilson Township, Putnam County, Missouri

See also

 Wilson Township (disambiguation)

Missouri township disambiguation pages